Chinonso Darlington Onuh (born 2 May 1992) is a Nigerian footballer who currently plays as a forward for KF Shkumbini.

Career statistics

Club

Notes

References

1992 births
Living people
Sportspeople from Lagos
Nigerian footballers
Association football forwards
KS Burreli players
FK Tomori Berat players
Besa Kavajë players
KF Shkumbini players
Kategoria e Parë players
Nigerian expatriate footballers
Nigerian expatriate sportspeople in Albania
Expatriate footballers in Albania